Tim Lucas is a former professional American football player who played linebacker for seven seasons for the Denver Broncos.

References 

1961 births
American football linebackers
Denver Broncos players
California Golden Bears football players
Living people
Players of American football from Stockton, California
National Football League replacement players